That Sinking Feeling is a 1980 film by Bill Forsyth.

That Sinking Feeling may also refer to:

"That Sinking Feeling", an episode of the TV series Bear Behaving Badly
"That Sinking Feeling", an episode of the TV series ChalkZone
"That Sinking Feeling", an episode of the TV series Darkwing Duck
"That Sinking Feeling", an episode of the TV series Estate of Panic
"That Sinking Feeling", an episode of the TV series The Legend of Zelda
"That Sinking Feeling", an episode of the TV series Lunar Jim
"That Sinking Feeling", an episode of the TV series MegaMan NT Warrior
"That Sinking Feeling", an episode of the TV series Mike, Lu & Og
"That Sinking Feeling", an episode of the TV series Phineas and Ferb
"That Sinking Feeling", an episode of the TV series SpongeBob SquarePants

See also
"That Stinking Feeling", an episode of the TV series Aladdin